Nubl Subdistrict  is a subdistrict of Azaz District in northwestern Aleppo Governorate of northern Syria. Administrative centre is the city of Nubl.

At the 2004 census, the subdistrict had a population of 51,948.

Cities, towns and villages

References 

Azaz District
Nubl